Tachina is a genus of large flies in the family Tachinidae. There are approximately 600 species worldwide. Most have larvae that are parasitoids of Lepidopteran caterpillars.

Taxonomy
Nowickia Wachtl, 1894, treated by some authors as a subgenus of  Tachina  Meigen, 1803, following most authors is now accepted  as a valid genus and treated separately.

Species
Species within this genus include:

Tachina actinosa (Reinhard, 1938)
Tachina acuminata (Tothill, 1924)
Tachina agnita Meigen, 1838
Tachina alacer Macquart, 1854
Tachina albidopilosa (Portschinsky, 1882)
Tachina albifrons (Walker, 1836)
Tachina algens Wiedemann, 1830
Tachina alticola (Malloch, 1932)
Tachina amasia Meigen, 1838
Tachina amica Waltl, 1837
Tachina amurensis (Zimin, 1929)
Tachina anguisipennis (Chao, 1987)
Tachina angulata (Meijere, 1924)
Tachina angusta Macquart, 1854
Tachina antennata (Walker, 1853)
Tachina apicalis (Chao, 1962)
Tachina ardens (Zimin, 1929)
Tachina arvensis Robineau-Desvoidy, 1830
Tachina asiatica (Tothill, 1918)
Tachina astytos Walker, 1849
Tachina atra (Malloch, 1932)
Tachina augens Walker, 1853
Tachina aurulenta (Chao, 1987)
Tachina barbata Zimin , 1984
Tachina basalis (Zimin, 1929)
Tachina bicolor Macquart, 1835
Tachina bijuncta Walker, 1853
Tachina bipartita Macquart, 1834
Tachina bombidiforma (Chao, 1987)
Tachina bombylia (Villeneuve, 1936)
Tachina breviala (Chao, 1987)
Tachina breviceps (Zimin, 1929)
Tachina brevicornis Macquart, 1854
Tachina brevipalpis (Chao & Zhou, 1993)
Tachina brevirostris (Tothill, 1924)
Tachina breviventris (Wiedemann, 1830)
Tachina brunneri (Loew, 1873)
Tachina brunnipalpis Macquart, 1834
Tachina californimyia Arnaud, 1992
Tachina calliphon (Walker, 1849)
Tachina canadensis (Tothill, 1924)
Tachina candens (Walker, 1849)
Tachina casta (Rondani, 1859)
Tachina celer Macquart, 1854
Tachina chaetaria Zimin, 1980
Tachina chaoi Mesnil, 1966
Tachina cheni (Chao, 1987)
Tachina chrysocephala (Walker, 1836)
Tachina chrysotelus (Walker, 1853)
Tachina cincta (Walker, 1853)
Tachina comitata Walker, 1853
Tachina compressa (Tothill, 1924)
Tachina confecta Walker, 1853
Tachina conjuncta Walker, 1853
Tachina contracta Walker, 1853
Tachina cordiforceps (Rowe, 1931)
Tachina corsicana (Villeneuve, 1931)
Tachina corylana Gimmerthal, 1834
Tachina defecta Walker, 1853
Tachina demissa Walker, 1853
Tachina derracm Walker, 1853
Tachina despicienda (Walker, 1861)
Tachina diaphana (Fabricius, 1805)
Tachina discifera (Walker, 1860)
Tachina dispartita Walker, 1853
Tachina dispecia Walker, 1853
Tachina dispuncta Walker, 1853
Tachina distenta Walker, 1853
Tachina diversa Waltl, 1837
Tachina divulsa Walker, 1853
Tachina domator Walker, 1853
Tachina dorycus Walker, 1849
Tachina effecta Walker, 1853
Tachina egula (Reinhard, 1938)
Tachina emarginata (Tothill, 1924)
Tachina enodata Walker, 1853
Tachina enotata Walker, 1853
Tachina enussa Walker, 1853
Tachina erecta Walker, 1853
Tachina erogara Walker, 1853
Tachina erratica Meigen, 1838
Tachina errors (Robineau-Desvoidy, 1830)
Tachina erucarum Schrank, 1803
Tachina eurekana (Reinhard, 1942)
Tachina evanida (Reinhard, 1953)
Tachina evocata Walker, 1853
Tachina evoluta Walker, 1853
Tachina ewdens Walker, 1853
Tachina exacta Walker, 1853
Tachina exagens Walker, 1853
Tachina exclusa Walker, 1853
Tachina excoriata (Wiedemann, 1830)
Tachina exilistyla Macquart, 1835
Tachina expleta Walker, 1853
Tachina fallax Meigen, 1824
Tachina fera (Linnaeus, 1761)
Tachina ferina Meigen, 1830
Tachina fesfiva Meigen, 1824
Tachina fischeri Gimmerthal, 1834
Tachina fissa Walker, 1853
Tachina flavicalyptrata Macquart, 1854
Tachina flaviceps Macquart, 1854
Tachina flavifrons Macquart, 1854
Tachina flavipes (Chao, 1962)
Tachina flavopilosa (Bigot, 1888)
Tachina flavosquama Chao, 1982
Tachina flexa Walker, 1853
Tachina florum Walker, 1849
Tachina furcipennis (Chao & Zhou, 1987)
Tachina garretti Arnaud, 1994
Tachina genurufa (Villeneuve, 1936)
Tachina gibbiforceps (Chao, 1962)
Tachina gimmerthali Gimmerthal, 1834
Tachina glabrata Meigen, 1824
Tachina griseicollis Meigen, 1824
Tachina griseifrons Zimin , 1984
Tachina grisescens Meigen, 1838
Tachina grossa (Linnaeus, 1758)
Tachina haemorrhoa (Mesnil, 1953)
Tachina hirta Macquart, 1834
Tachina hispida (Tothill, 1924)
Tachina hortensis Meigen, 1838
Tachina idiotica Meigen, 1824
Tachina imbuta (Walker, 1853)
Tachina incisa Macquart, 1834
Tachina infestans Walker, 1853
Tachina inflexicornis Macquart, 1854
Tachina innovata (Walker, 1861)
Tachina inoperta Walker, 1853
Tachina inquilina Walker, 1853
Tachina insedata Walker, 1853
Tachina instigata Meigen, 1835
Tachina intacta Walker, 1853
Tachina intaminata Walker, 1853
Tachina intercedens Walker, 1853
Tachina interclusa Walker, 1853
Tachina intermedia (Reinhard, 1942)
Tachina intermixta' Walker, 1853
Tachina interna Walker, 1853
Tachina interrupta (Robineau-Desvoidy, 1863)
Tachina intracta Walker, 1853
Tachina intricata Meigen, 1830
Tachina inumbrata Meigen, 1838
Tachina invelata (Reinhard, 1953)
Tachina involuta Walker, 1853
Tachina iota Chao & Arnaud, 1993
Tachina isea (Walker, 1849)
Tachina jacobsoni (Townsend, 1926)
Tachina jakovlewii (Portschinsky, 1882)
Tachina javana Malloch, 1932
Tachina jawensis Chao & Arnaud, 1993
Tachina kolomietzi Zimin, 1967
Tachina kunmingensis Chao & Arnaud, 1993
Tachina laeta Robineau-Desvoidy, 1830
Tachina laterolinea (Chao, 1962)
Tachina lateromaculata (Chao, 1962)
Tachina latianulum (Tothill, 1924)
Tachina latifacies (Tothill, 1924)
Tachina latiforceps (Tothill, 1924)
Tachina latifrons (Tothill, 1924)
Tachina latigena (Tothill, 1924)
Tachina levicula Macquart, 1854
Tachina lindemanni Gimmerthal, 1834
Tachina longiunguis (Tothill, 1924)
Tachina longiventris (Chao, 1962)
Tachina ludibunda Macquart, 1854
Tachina lueola (Coquillett, 1898)
Tachina lurida (Fabricius, 1781)
Tachina luteisquama Zimin , 1984
Tachina macropuchia Chao , 1982
Tachina macropuchia Chao, 1982
Tachina macularia Wiedemann, 1824
Tachina magica Meigen, 1824
Tachina magna (Giglio-Tos, 1890)
Tachina magnicornis (Zetterstedt, 1844)
Tachina majae (Zimin, 1935)
Tachina mallochi Chao & Arnaud, 1993
Tachina margella (Reinhard, 1942)
Tachina marginella (Reinhard, 1942)
Tachina medogensis (Chao & Zhou, 1988)
Tachina melaleuca Meigen, 1824
Tachina metallica Brullé, 1833
Tachina minor (Suster, 1953)
Tachina minuta (Chao, 1962)
Tachina montana (Townsend, 1916)
Tachina morosa Meigen, 1824
Tachina multans Walker, 1853
Tachina nearctica Arnaud, 1992
Tachina nectarea Meigen, 1824
Tachina nicaeana (Robineau-Desvoidy, 1863)
Tachina nigella (Reinhard, 1938)
Tachina nigrifera (Walker, 1853)
Tachina nigrocastanea Chao, 1962
Tachina nigrolineata Stephens, 1829
Tachina nitida (Wulp, 1882)
Tachina nivalis (Tothill, 1924)
Tachina nupta (Rondani, 1859)
Tachina objecta Walker, 1853
Tachina occidentalis (Wiedemann, 1830)
Tachina oligoria Arnaud, 1992
Tachina orbitalis (Reinhard, 1942)
Tachina pagana Meigen, 1838
Tachina pallipalpis Macquart, 1834
Tachina palpalis (Coquillett, 1902)
Tachina particeps Walker, 1853
Tachina persica (Portschinsky, 1873)
Tachina pertinens Walker, 1853
Tachina picea (Robineau-Desvoidy, 1830)
Tachina piceifrons (Townsend, 1916)
Tachina pictilis (Reinhard, 1942)
Tachina pilosa (Tothill, 1924)
Tachina pingbian Chao & Arnaud, 1993
Tachina planiforceps (Tothill, 1924)
Tachina planiventris (Macquart, 1851)
Tachina plumasana (Reinhard, 1953)
Tachina plumbea Stephens, 1829
Tachina politula (Coquillett, 1898)
Tachina polychaeta Egger, 1861
Tachina potens (Robineau-Desvoidy, 1863)
Tachina praeceps (Meigen, 1824)
Tachina pubiventris Chao, 1962
Tachina pubiventris (Chao, 1962)
Tachina pudibunda Gimmerthal, 1829
Tachina pulvera (Chao, 1962)
Tachina pulverea (Chao, 1962)
Tachina pulvillata Belanovsky, 1953
Tachina pumila Macquart, 1854
Tachina punctocincta (Villeneuve, 1936)
Tachina pusilla Macquart, 1834
Tachina pygmaea Macquart, 1834
Tachina qingzangensis (Chao, 1982)
Tachina quadricincia Stephens, 1829
Tachina quadrimaculata Macquart, 1835
Tachina quadrinotata Meigen, 1824
Tachina quadrivittata Zimin , 1984
Tachina reclusa Walker, 1853
Tachina rectinervis Macquart, 1854
Tachina refecta Walker, 1853
Tachina robinsoni (Townsend, 1915)
Tachina rohdendorfi Zimin, 1935
Tachina rohdendorfiana Chao & Arnaud, 1993
Tachina rondanii (Giglio-Tos, 1890)
Tachina rostrata (Tothill, 1924)
Tachina rubricornis Zetterstedt, 1844
Tachina ruficauda (Chao, 1987)
Tachina ruficornis (Robineau-Desvoidy, 1830)
Tachina rufifrons Macquart, 1854
Tachina rufiventris Suster, 1929
Tachina rufoanalis (Macquart, 1851)
Tachina rustica Robineau-Desvoidy, 1830
Tachina sacontala Walker, 1849
Tachina saltatrix (Wiedemann, 1830)
Tachina scita (Walker, 1853)
Tachina senoptera Macquart, 1834
Tachina sibirica Kolomiets , 1984
Tachina silvestris Robineau-Desvoidy, 1830
Tachina sinerea Chao, 1962
Tachina sobria Walker, 1853
Tachina soror Robineau-Desvoidy, 1830
Tachina sosilus (Walker, 1849)
Tachina spina Chao , 1987
Tachina spina (Chao, 1987)
Tachina spineiventer (Tothill, 1924)
Tachina spinipennis (Wiedemann, 1830)
Tachina spinosa (Tothill, 1924)
Tachina stackelbergi (Zimin, 1929)
Tachina stackelbergiana Herting, 1993
Tachina strenua (Robineau-Desvoidy, 1863)
Tachina stupida Herting, 1993
Tachina subcinerea Walker, 1853
Tachina subfasciata Meigen, 1838
Tachina subpilosa (Robineau-Desvoidy, 1830)
Tachina subvaria (Walker, 1853)
Tachina sumatrensis (Townsend, 1926)
Tachina tadzhica Zimin, 1980
Tachina taenionota Meigen, 1830
Tachina tahoensis (Reinhard, 1938)
Tachina tenebrifera (Walker, 1853)
Tachina tephra Meigen, 1824
Tachina terminalis Meigen, 1824
Tachina testacea (Robineau-Desvoidy, 1830)
Tachina testaceifrons Roser, 1840
Tachina testaceipes Stephens, 1829
Tachina tienmushan Chao & Arnaud, 1993
Tachina trianguli (Walker, 1849)
Tachina tricincta Meigen, 1824
Tachina tricolor (Lichtwardt, 1909)
Tachina trifasciata (Walker, 1836)
Tachina trigonophora Zimin, 1980
Tachina trimaculata Meigen, 1824
Tachina turanica Zimin, 1980
Tachina ursina (Meigen, 1824)
Tachina ursinoidea (Tothill, 1918)
Tachina vallata (Meigen, 1838)
Tachina venosa Meigen, 1824
Tachina ventralis (Wiedemann, 1824)
Tachina vernalis (Robineau-Desvoidy, 1830)
Tachina vicina Robineau-Desvoidy, 1830
Tachina victoria (Townsend, 1897)
Tachina virginea Meigen, 1838
Tachina viridulans Walker, 1853
Tachina vittata (Walker, 1853)
Tachina vulgata (Walker, 1853)
Tachina xizangensis (Chao, 1982)
Tachina zaqu Chao & Arnaud, 1993
Tachina zimini (Chao, 1962)

References

 
Muscomorph flies of Europe
Taxa named by Johann Wilhelm Meigen
Tachinidae genera